Piers Morgan On... is a British television travelogue programme presented by journalist Piers Morgan, broadcast on ITV in the United Kingdom. In the series he visited Dubai, Monte Carlo, Hollywood, Las Vegas, Marbella and Shanghai.

Episode list

Series 1

Series 2

ITV (TV network) original programming
British travel television series
Television shows filmed in the United Arab Emirates
Television shows filmed in Monaco
Television shows filmed in Los Angeles
Television shows shot in the Las Vegas Valley
Television shows filmed in Spain
Television shows filmed in Shanghai